The 2021 Epping Forest District Council election took place on 6 May 2021 to elect members of Epping Forest District Council in England on the same day as other local elections.

This election marked the first time in over 22 years that the Labour Party have stood in every ward. The For Britain Movement stood in 3 out of 4 of the Waltham Abbey seats. Reform UK also stood for the first time in Moreton and Fyfield.

There was little change in Epping Forest's political makeup. The Conservatives cemented their position as the largest party in the district taking 14 seats, 11 of which were holds and 3 were vacant seat wins.

The Loughton Residents Association had a strong showing, dominating voting in all Loughton wards up for election, despite losing their vote share. The Liberal Democrats suffered their largest loss in the percentage of the vote in the district council's history.

Despite Labour winning their largest share of the vote in the district since 2000, they failed to gain any seats. Angela Ayre, secretary of the Epping Forest Labour Party stated they are "committed to becoming a power to be reckoned with in Epping Forest".

Results summary

Ward results

Buckhurst Hill East

Buckhurst Hill West

Chigwell Row

Chigwell Village

Epping Hemnall

Epping Lindsey & Thornwood Common

Grange Hill

High Ongar, Willingale and the Rodings

Loughton Alderton

Loughton Broadway

Loughton Fairmead

Loughton Forest

Loughton Roding

Loughton St. John's

Loughton St. Mary's

Moreton & Fyfield

Passingford

Theydon Bois

Waltham Abbey High Beach

Waltham Abbey Honey Lane

Waltham Abbey North East

Waltham Abbey South West

References

Epping Forest
2021
2020s in Essex